Encyclopedias in the Dutch language include:
Winkler Prins, published in print between 1870 and 1993 and made available digitally to the present day
Oosthoek, published between 1907 and 1981
Christelijke Encyclopedie, published between 1926 and 2005
Eerste Nederlandse Systematisch Ingerichte Encyclopaedie, published between 1946 and 1952
Standaard Encyclopedie, published between 1969 and 1974 by Standaard Uitgeverij Antwerpen
Grote Nederlandse Larousse Encyclopedie, published between 1971 and 1979
Grote Spectrum Encyclopedie, published between 1974 and 1980
Dutch Wikipedia, the Dutch language edition of Wikipedia, established in 2001
Encyclopedie van de Vlaamse Beweging, published for the first time in 1975
Nieuwe Encyclopedie van de Vlaamse Beweging, published for the first time in 1998

References

Dutch language
 
Lists of encyclopedias

nl:Encyclopedie#Nederlandstalige encyclopedieën